The year 1701 in science and technology involved some significant events.

Earth sciences
 Edmond Halley's General Chart of the Variation of the Compass is first published, the first to show magnetic declination (in the Atlantic Ocean) and the first on which isogonic, or Halleyan, lines appear.

Medicine
 Italian physician Giacomo Pylarini inoculates children with smallpox in Constantinople, in hopes of preventing more serious smallpox sickness when the children are older, thus becoming the first immunologist.

Physics
 Joseph Sauveur coins the French word acoustique, from which the English word acoustics is derived.

Technology
 The seed drill, invented by Jethro Tull, allows farmers to sow seeds in well-spaced rows at specific depths.
 Sir Isaac Newton, reporting (anonymously) to the British Royal Society, describes creation of a liquid-in-glass thermometer that is 3 ft (1 m) long and has a two-inch (5-cm) diameter bulb using linseed oil.

Births
 January 28 – Charles Marie de La Condamine, French geographer (died 1774)
 May 14 – William Emerson, English mathematician (died 1782)
 November 27 – Anders Celsius, Swedish astronomer, physicist, and mathematician  (died 1744)
 Approximate date
 Thomas Bayes, English mathematician (died 1761)
 Henry Hindley, English clock and scientific instrument maker (died 1771)

Deaths

References

 
18th century in science
1700s in science